Dixie Beehives are a pair of defunct junior ice hockey teams from Weston, Ontario, Canada, which is now part of Toronto, Ontario. They played in the Ontario Provincial Junior A Hockey League and the Central Junior B Hockey League.

Jr. A Beehives
Founded in 1949 in what became the Metro Junior B Hockey League (in 1956). The Staffords disappeared but were replaced when the East York Rockets moved to Mississauga in 1953. The Beehives won Metro Junior B titles in 1970 and 1971. They joined the new Ontario Provincial Junior "A" league in 1972 and stayed until the league began to fall apart in 1986, although the Beehives folded a year before the league did due to their rink being sold and closed down. The Beehives were three time Sutherland Cup All-Ontario Junior "B" Champions: 1957, 1970, and 1971.

Their first Sutherland Cup came in 1957 when St. Michael's Buzzers refused to take part in provincial playdowns due to exams. Dixie defeated the Peterborough Stoneys of the Eastern Junior B Hockey League and the Sarnia Legionnaires of the Western Junior B Hockey League to win the Sutherland Cup 4-games-to-2. In 1967, the Beehives made it back to the Sutherland Cup but were thwarted 4-games-to-2 by the Kitchener Greenshirts. In 1970 and 1971 as Metro Champs, they came back again defeating the Hamilton Mountain Bees both years 4-games-to-1 with one tie and 4-games-to-1 respectively.

In 2007, it was announced that the Oswego Admirals of the Ontario Provincial Junior A Hockey League had been bought by interests in Weston. The team moved to the Weston Arena and took the name Toronto Dixie Beehives. They were scheduled to begin play in September 2007.

Dixie Staffords 1949 - 1950
East York Rockets 1950 - 1953
Dixie Rockets 1953 - 1957
Dixie Beehives 1957 - 1986

Season-by-season results

Playoffs
1973 Lost semi-final
Dixie Beehives defeated Seneca Flyers 4-games-to-3
Wexford Raiders defeated Dixie Beehives 4-games-to-2
1974 Lost Quarter-final
North York Rangers defeated Dixie Beehives 4-games-to-3
1975 DNQ
1976 DNQ
1977 DNQ
1978 Lost semi-final
Dixie Beehives defeated Aurora Tigers 4-games-to-1
Royal York Royals defeated Dixie Beehives 4-games-to-none
1979 Lost final
Dixie Beehives defeated Aurora Tigers 4-games-to-none
Dixie Beehives defeated North Bay Trappers 4-games-to-3
Guelph Platers defeated Dixie Beehives 4-games-to-1
1980 Lost semi-final
Dixie Beehives defeated Wexford Raiders 4-games-to-none
North York Rangers defeated Dixie Beehives 4-games-to-2
1981 Lost Quarter-final
North York Rangers defeated Dixie Beehives 4-games-to-1
1982 Lost semi-final
Dixie Beehives defeated Brampton Warriors 4-games-to-1
Markham Waxers defeated Dixie Beehives 4-games-to-2
1983 Lost Quarter-final
Hamilton Mountain A's defeated Dixie Beehives 4-games-to-1
1984 Lost final
Dixie Beehives defeated Aurora Tigers 4-games-to-none
Dixie Beehives defeated Newmarket Flyers 4-games-to-3
Orillia Travelways defeated Dixie Beehives 4-games-to-1
1985 Lost Quarter-final
Markham Waxers defeated Dixie Beehives 4-games-to-1
1986 DNQ

Sutherland Cup appearances
1957: Dixie Rockets defeated Sarnia Legionnaires 4-games-to-2 with 1 tie
1967: Kitchener Greenshirts defeated Dixie Beehives 4-games-to-2
1970: Dixie Beehives defeated Hamilton Red Wings 4-games-to-1 with 1 tie
1971: Dixie Beehives defeated Hamilton Red Wings 4-games-to-1

Jr. B Beehives
Originally known as the Dixie Ventures, the Central Junior B Hockey League team changed their name to the Beehives and became the affiliate of the Dixie Beehives Jr. A (1957-1986) from the OHA Tier II Junior "A" League. They folded in 1982. 

Dixie Ventures 1974 - 1977
Dixie Beehives 1977 - 1982

Jr. B season-by-season results

Notable alumni
Peter Bakovic
Paul Beraldo
Dave Burrows
Randy Cunneyworth
Denis DeJordy
Rick Dudley
John Grisdale
Mike Hough
Mike Kaszycki
Nick Kypreos
Ray LeBlanc
Brett MacDonald
Bill McDougall
Dave McLlwain
Gus Mortson
Doug Patey
Larry Patey
Dave Poulin
Dave Reid
Mike Sands
Brendan Shanahan
Jack Stanfield
Bill Stewart
Warren Young

Defunct ice hockey teams in Canada
Ice hockey teams in Ontario
Sport in Mississauga
1949 establishments in Ontario
1986 disestablishments in Ontario
Ice hockey clubs established in 1949
Ice hockey clubs disestablished in 1986